The Veneto Open is a WTA 125-level professional women's tennis tournament. It takes place on outdoor grass courts, in the month of June at the Tennis Club Gaiba in the city of Gaiba in Italy in preparation for Wimbledon Championships. The prize money is $115,000. When the tournament was introduced in 2022, it became the first ever WTA 125 tournament to be played on grass courts. In popular culture, the tournament is also called Gaibledon among local fans.

Results

Singles

Doubles

See also
 Emilia-Romagna Open

References

External links
 Official website

Tennis tournaments in Italy
Grass court tennis tournaments
WTA 125 tournaments
Annual events in Italy
2022 establishments in Italy
Recurring sporting events established in 2022